Phacelia greenei is a species of phacelia known by the common name Scott Valley phacelia. It is endemic to the southern Klamath Mountains of far northern California, where it is known only from Scott Valley, a valley known for its alfalfa growing, and vicinity.

It is a serpentine soils endemic growing in the coniferous forests of the mountains.

This is an annual herb with a branching or unbranched erect stem reaching no more than about 15 centimeters in height. It is glandular and coated in short hairs called trichomes. The lance-shaped, smooth-edged leaves are up to 3 centimeters in length. The hairy inflorescence is a small, one-sided curving or coiling cyme of five-lobed flowers. Each flower is about half a centimeter long and deep purple or blue in color with a white or yellowish tubular throat. The leaves of the plant are alternate in pattern and are long and narrow. The herb begins blooming in April and stops blooming in June.

References

External links
Jepson Manual Treatment
Photo gallery

greenei
Endemic flora of California
Flora of the Klamath Mountains
Natural history of Siskiyou County, California